This article contains a list of Ancient names of a few Goan villages and Agraharas.

List

|Vellimpura (Velim)
|Chandrapura (Chandor)

See also
Agrahara

References
 "Gomant Kalika"(monthly),published by Kalika Prakashan Vishwast Mandal
 "Gomantak Prakruti ani Sanskruti" by B.D. Satoskar,published by Shubhada Publication
 "Hindu Temples and deities" by Rui Pereira Gomes

Hinduism in Goa
History of Goa
Villages in Goa